Kjell Edvard Helland (born 29 May 1940 in Melhus) is a Norwegian politician for the Labour Party.

He was elected to the Norwegian Parliament from Sør-Trøndelag in 1973, and was re-elected on three occasions.

On the local level he was a deputy member of the executive committee of Trondheim city council from 1971 to 1975.

Outside politics he spent large parts of his career in Norway Post, before rounding off his career a labour bureaucrat in Sør-Trøndelag.

References

1940 births
Living people
People from Melhus
Members of the Storting
Politicians from Trondheim
Labour Party (Norway) politicians
20th-century Norwegian politicians